Agriculture Tragic is the tenth studio album by Canadian country singer-songwriter Corb Lund. It was originally scheduled for release on April 24, 2020 under New West Records, however it was pushed to June 26, 2020 due to the COVID-19 pandemic

Tour
A tour of Canada in support of the album was announced for April–July 2020, but was rescheduled to November 2020.

Critical reception
Agricultural Tragic was met with "universal acclaim" reviews from critics. At Metacritic, which assigns a weighted average rating out of 100 to reviews from mainstream publications, this release received an average score of 81, based on 4 reviews.

Track listing

Charts

References

2020 albums
Corb Lund and the Hurtin' Albertans albums
Albums postponed due to the COVID-19 pandemic
New West Records albums